This is a complete list in alphabetical order of cricketers who played first-class cricket matches for Manchester Cricket Club. Manchester played a total of 13 matches between 1844 and 1858 which have been retrospectively classified as first-class.  The club is first recorded in matches from 1822.

The club is a fore-runner of Lancashire County Cricket Club which was formed in 1865. A team with the Lancashire name played four first-class matches, all against Yorkshire sides, between 1849 and 1851. Players who played in these matches only are not included in the list below.

Many players represented other teams besides Manchester.

A

B

C

D

E

G

H

K

L

M

P

R

S

T

W

Notes

References

Manchester
Cricketers